Passione is a play by the American playwright Albert Innaurato. The action is set in South Philadelphia in the present.

It ran on Broadway at the Morosco Theatre from September 23 to October 5, 1980. It was directed by Frank Langella. Costume design was by William Ivey Long and lighting design was by Paul Gallo.

References

1980 plays